The speaker of a deliberative assembly, especially a legislative body, is its presiding office holder. The title was first used in 1377 in England.

Usage 
The title was first recorded in 1377 to describe the role of Thomas de Hungerford in the Parliament of England.

The speaker's official role is to moderate debate, make rulings on procedure, announce the results of votes, and the like. The speaker decides who may speak and has the powers to discipline members who break the procedures of the chamber or house. The speaker often also represents the body in person, as the voice of the body in ceremonial and some other situations. 

By convention, speakers are normally addressed in Parliament as 'Mister Speaker' if a man, or 'Madam Speaker' if a woman. In other cultures, other styles are used, mainly being equivalents of English "chairman" or "president". Many bodies also have a speaker pro tempore (or deputy speaker), designated to fill in when the speaker is not available.

The speaker is commonly supported by a Speaker's Office.

Examples of speakers include:

Armenia
The President of the National Assembly of Armenia is the speaker of the house in the National Assembly of Armenia. The formation of this position was established on 1 August 1918.

Australia
The Speaker of the House of Representatives is the presiding officer of the Australian House of Representatives, the lower house of the Parliament of Australia. The President of the Senate is the presiding officer of the Australian Senate, the upper house of the Parliament.

Canada
In Canada, the Speaker of the House of Commons (président de la Chambre des communes) is the individual elected to preside over the House of Commons, the elected lower house. The speaker is a Member of Parliament (MP) and is elected at the beginning of each new parliament by fellow MPs. The Speaker's role in presiding over Canada's House of Commons is similar to that of speakers elsewhere in other countries that use the Westminster system. The Speaker does not vote except in the case of a tie. By convention, if required to vote, the Speaker will vote in favour of continuing debate on a matter, but will not ultimately vote for a measure to be approved.

The Speaker of the Senate of Canada (président du Sénat) is the presiding officer of the Senate of Canada, the appointed upper house. The Speaker represents the Senate at official functions, rules on questions of parliamentary procedure and parliamentary privilege, and presides over debates and voting in the "Red Chamber". The Speaker of the Senate is appointed by the Governor General of Canada from amongst sitting senators upon the advice of the Prime Minister. The Speaker has a vote on all matters. In the event of a tie, the matter fails.

At the provincial level, the presiding officer of the provincial legislatures is called the "Speaker" (président)  in all provinces except Quebec, where the term "President" is used.  The presiding officer fulfills the same role as the Speaker of the House of Commons.

Chile
The President of the Chamber of Deputies is the highest authority of the Chamber of Deputies of Chile. The President of the Senate is the highest authority of the Senate of Chile.

China (Mainland)
In the People's Republic of China, the Chairman of the Standing Committee of the National People's Congress is the presiding officer of the Standing Committee of the National People's Congress which is considered China's top legislative body. As stipulated in Article 84 of the Constitution of China, should both the President and Vice-President become incapacitated, and the National People's Congress is unable to elect a timely replacement, the Chairman of the NPC Standing Committee will act as President.

Hong Kong 
The President of the Legislative Council of Hong Kong is the speaker of the Legislative Council and is elected by and from its members. The President presides over the Council meetings and is empowered to enforce the Rules of Procedures solely.

While Members of the Legislative Council may be Hong Kong residents who are not Chinese citizens, the President can only be selected from those who possess a Chinese nationality and does not have a right of abode in foreign countries.

Italy 
Parliamentarism in Italy is centred on the Presidents of the two Houses, vested in defence of the members and of the assembly as a whole; so "the Speaker invites the representative of the Government not to deviate from the rules of parliamentary behaviour". Now constitutional community highlights changes also in this role. The President of the Senate also acts as deputy President of the Republic "in all cases in which the President cannot perform them".

New Zealand
In New Zealand, the Speaker of the House of Representatives is the presiding officer of the New Zealand House of Representatives, the only chamber of the New Zealand Parliament. Precedent set by other Westminster-style parliaments means that Members of Parliament must always address the Speaker.

Singapore
In Singapore, the Speaker of the Parliament of Singapore is the head officer of the country's legislature.  By recent tradition, the Prime Minister nominates a person, who may or may not be an elected Member of Parliament (MP), for the role. The person's name is then proposed and seconded by the MPs, before being elected as Speaker. The Constitution states that Parliament has the freedom to decide how to elect its Speaker.

While the Speaker does not have to be an elected MP, they must possess the qualifications to stand for election as an MP as provided for in the Constitution. The Speaker also cannot be a Cabinet Minister or Parliamentary Secretary, and must resign from those positions prior to being elected as Speaker.

The Speaker is one of the few public sector roles which allow its office-holder to automatically qualify as a candidate in the Singapore presidential elections.

Taiwan
The Legislative Yuan is the highest legislative body of Taiwan. The President of the Legislative Yuan presides over its meetings and is elected by the legislators from among themselves. Until 1993, the President of the Control Yuan was elected by and from the members like the speaker of many other parliamentary bodies.

United Kingdom

In the Parliament of the United Kingdom, the Speaker is the individual elected to preside over the elected House of Commons. The speaker is a Member of Parliament (MP) and is elected at the beginning of each new parliament by fellow MPs.

The Lord Speaker is the presiding officer of the House of Lords. The presiding officer of the House of Lords was until recently the Lord Chancellor, who was also a member of the government (a cabinet member) and the head of the judicial branch. The Lord Chancellor did not have the same authority to discipline members of the Lords that the speaker of the Commons has in that house. The Lord Speaker is elected by the members of the House of Lords and is expected to be politically impartial.

Devolved legislatures 

The Presiding Officer of the Scottish Parliament is the President of the Scottish Parliament.

The Llywydd of the Senedd is the speaker of Senedd Cymru, the Welsh parliament.

The Speaker of the Northern Ireland Assembly presides over the Northern Ireland Assembly.

United States

Federal 
Both chambers of the United States Congress have a presiding officer defined by the United States Constitution. The Speaker of the United States House of Representatives presides over the lower house of Congress, the House of Representatives. The Speaker, elected by the entire House, is the top-ranking officer of the legislative branch of the federal government. Unlike in Commonwealth realms, the position is partisan, and the Speaker often plays an important part in running the House and advancing a political platform; Joseph Gurney Cannon, speaker from 1903 to 1911, is an extreme example.

The Vice President of the United States, as provided by the United States Constitution formally presides over the upper house, the Senate. In practice, however, the Vice President does not regularly appear in Congress owing to responsibilities in the Executive branch and the fact that the Vice President may only vote to break a tie, something that rarely occurs due to the filibuster preventing tie votes from occurring in practice.  In the Vice President's absence, the presiding role is delegated to the most Senior member of the majority party, who is the President pro tempore of the United States Senate.  Since the Senate's rules give little power to its non-member presider (who may be of the minority party), the task of presiding over daily business is typically rotated among junior members of the majority party.

States
In the forty-nine states that have a bicameral legislature, the highest leadership position in the lower house is usually called the "Speaker" and the upper house is usually the "President of the (State) Senate. In Nebraska—the only state with a unicameral legislature—the senators elect one senator to serve as "Speaker of the Nebraska Legislature". In Tennessee, the senators elect a "Speaker of the Senate" who presides over the Tennessee Senate and serves as lieutenant governor.

Similar posts

The presiding officer for an upper house of a bicameral legislature usually has a different title, although substantially the same duties. When the upper house is called a senate, the equivalent title is often President of the Senate. Australia, Chile, the United States and many other countries have upper houses with presiding officers titled "president". In several American republics, the vice president of the country serves as the president of the upper house. This pattern is not universal, however. Some upper houses, including those of Canada, have a speaker.

The Presiding Officer of the National Assembly for Wales, Presiding Officer of the Scottish Parliament, and Presiding Officer of the Northern Ireland Assembly fulfill the same role as the speaker.

List of current speakers

See also
 Generic
 Speaker of the senate (disambiguation)
 Speaker of the House of Assembly (disambiguation)
 Speaker of the House of Commons
 Speaker of the House of Representatives (disambiguation)
 Speaker of the Legislative Assembly
 Speaker of the National Assembly (disambiguation)
 List of current presidents of assembly

  Specific
 Speaker of the Senate of Canada
 List of speakers of the House of Commons of England
 Speaker of the Indonesian People's Representative Council
 Cathaoirleach (Speaker of the Irish Senate)
 Speaker of the Legislative Assembly of Ontario
 Speaker of the Palestinian Legislative Council
 Marshal of the Senate of the Republic of Poland
 Lawspeaker
 Speaker of the Grand National Assembly of Turkey
 Lord Speaker (Speaker of the United Kingdom House of Lords)
 Speaker of the United States House of Representatives

Notes

References

Further reading
 Bergougnous, Georges. Presiding Officers of National Parliamentary Assemblies: A World Comparative Study.  Trans.  Jennifer Lorenzi. Geneva: Inter-Parliamentary Union, 1997. .
 Green, Matthew N. The Speaker of the House: A Study of Leadership (Yale University Press; 2010) 292 pages; US House

 
 
Parliamentary titles
Legislatures
Government occupations
Positions of authority
Legal professions